Cabuya is a corregimiento in Chame District, Panamá Oeste Province, Panama with a population of 1,666 as of 2010. Its population as of 1990 was 1,206; its population as of 2000 was 1,354.

References

Corregimientos of Panamá Oeste Province